The Col de Balme  (2,195 m) is a high mountain pass of the Alps, located on the border between Switzerland and France. It connects Trient in the Swiss canton of Valais to Argentière in the French department of Haute-Savoie. The pass lies between the summits of Tête de Balme and Les Grandes Otanes.

The Col de Balme lies on the Tour du Mont Blanc walk. A restaurant is located above the summit of the pass.

References

External links
Col de Balme on Hikr

Balme
Balme
Balme
France–Switzerland border crossings
Balme